Bartholomäus (Barthel) Schink (November 27, 1927 – November 10, 1944) was a member of the  Edelweiss Pirates, active in the Ehrenfeld Group (Ehrenfeld is a district of Cologne) in Cologne, which resisted the Nazi regime. He was among the 13 members of that group who were publicly hanged in Cologne by the Gestapo on 10 November 1944. Although they were not tried, the group was accused of killing five people and planning an attack on the EL-DE Haus, the local Gestapo headquarters. 

The street in the Ehrenfeld suburb of Cologne, next to the Ehrenfeld railway station where Schink was hanged, is named after Schink. Yad Vashem recognized Barthel Schink as Righteous Among the Nations for risking his life to hide Jews from the Nazi persecution. There is a memorial plaque honoring the memory of all those killed from the Edelweiss Pirates and the Ehrenfeld Group.

See also 
 List of Germans who resisted Nazism

References

Further reading 
 Alexander Goeb: Er war sechzehn, als man ihn hängte. Das kurze Leben des Widerstandskämpfers Bartholomäus Schink. 
 Bernd-A. Rusinek: Gesellschaft in der Katastrophe - Terror, Illegalität, Widerstand Köln 1944/45. Düsseldorfer Schriften zur Neueren Landesgeschichte und zur Geschichte Nordrhein-Westfalens, Band 24, Klartext-Verlag,

External links
bartholomäus Schink

1927 births
1944 deaths
Executed German Resistance members
People from Cologne
People from the Rhine Province
Executed people from North Rhine-Westphalia
People executed by Nazi Germany by hanging
People from North Rhine-Westphalia executed by Nazi Germany
German Righteous Among the Nations